Ji Xiaoou  (born 11 June 1980) is a Chinese freestyle skier. She was born in Baishan. She competed at the 1994 Winter Olympics, in women's aerials, and also at the 1998 Winter Olympics.

References

External links 
 

1980 births
People from Baishan
Living people
Chinese female freestyle skiers
Olympic freestyle skiers of China
Freestyle skiers at the 1994 Winter Olympics
Freestyle skiers at the 1998 Winter Olympics
Skiers from Jilin